Tanna auripennis is an insect, a species of cicada of the genus Tanna.

References

External links
 
 

Tanna (genus)
Hemiptera of Asia
Insects described in 1930